For Sale is the sixth album by British pop group Right Said Fred.

Track listing
“I Love My Car”
“Play On”
“Where Do You Go To My Lovely?”
“Brand New Girlfriend”
“Drifting”
“Cry”
“Sweet Wonderful You”
“Kiss My Softly”
“Love Pressure”
“Jump Start”
"Cost of Loving”
“Simple”
“Obvious”
“Here I Am”
“Worthless Love”
“Hollywood Ending”

2002 albums
Right Said Fred albums